Thomas Boyd (born 22 August 1995) is a former professional Australian rules footballer. He was selected with the first overall pick in the 2013 AFL draft by the Greater Western Sydney Giants, but was traded to the Western Bulldogs following the 2014 season. In 2016, he helped the Bulldogs win their first premiership since 1954. After struggling with injuries and mental health, Boyd announced his retirement from AFL football in May 2019.

Early life
Boyd attended Luther College in Croydon Hills, Victoria and played junior football for the Norwood Football Club.

Playing for Eastern Ranges in the TAC Cup from 2011 to 2013, Boyd was the competition's leading goal kicker in 2012 and later performed well for Vic Metro at the 2012 national carnival.

In April 2013, Boyd visited Copenhagen in his mother's native Denmark for three days as part of the AIS-AFL Academy tour.

AFL career

GWS Giants (2014)
Boyd was selected with the first overall pick in the 2013 AFL draft by the Greater Western Sydney Giants. In his reserves debut on 1 March 2014, Boyd kicked three goals and demonstrated his versatility with a stint in the ruck. He went on to make his senior debut on 20 April 2014 in the Giants' 137–72 loss to the Adelaide Crows; he managed just five disposals and didn't score. He finished the 2014 season with eight goals in nine games.

Western Bulldogs (2015–2019)

Trade request
On 13 October 2014, Boyd requested a trade to the Western Bulldogs. This development was made even more remarkable considering that only days prior, Bulldogs' captain Ryan Griffen had requested a trade away from the club and Brendan McCartney had resigned as Senior Coach. Despite the Giants initial stance claiming that Boyd would not be traded under any circumstances, two days after Boyd handed in his trade request, he was traded to the Bulldogs in exchange for Griffen and pick 6 in the 2014 AFL draft. He later signed a seven-year, $7 million contract with the Bulldogs.

2015 season
In his debut game for the Bulldogs on 4 April 2015, Boyd was well-held by Eagle Jeremy McGovern but managed to kick an important late goal to help his new club secure a Round 1 win over the West Coast Eagles. On 22 June 2015, he earned the AFL's Rising Star nomination for Round 12 after kicking four goals and recording eight marks in a win over the Brisbane Lions. Following a poor showing in the Bulldogs' Round 16 game against Geelong, Boyd was dropped from the senior squad and failed to be recalled to the AFL level for the rest of the season, playing out the year with the team's VFL side. He helped Footscray reach the VFL finals, kicking two goals in the team's semi-final loss to Essendon.

2016 season
Boyd's right shoulder was a constant problem for him throughout the 2016 season after he first aggravated it in the club's round four game against Carlton. The injury kept him on the sidelines for much of the first half of the season, after which he returned with the Bulldogs' VFL side, Footscray. He was in line to receive a recall to the AFL side for Round 15, but a drunken, "violent" altercation with teammate Zaine Cordy set him back. He was suspended indefinitely by the club on 30 June 2016 and fined $5,000. Boyd responded with a four-goal haul in Footscray's 12-point loss to Coburg on July 2. He returned to the AFL side in Round 17 and remained there for the rest of the year. He showed promise when he kicked three goals in the Bulldogs' loss to Geelong in Round 19. He went on to help the Bulldogs reach their first VFL/AFL grand final since 1961. In the 2016 Grand Final, Boyd completed a coming-of-age finals series with his highly influential aerial work, finishing the match with eight marks (six contested) and three goals. His third goal late in the fourth quarter from the centre square sealed the win for the Bulldogs, defeating the Sydney Swans by 22 points to become the first team to win a premiership from seventh on the ladder.

2017 season
Despite enjoying a breakthrough finals series in 2016, Boyd struggled to reproduce that form in 2017. Coach Luke Beveridge admitted he saw Boyd as a ruckman more than a key forward at this stage of his career. He kicked seven goals from 11 games, and averaged 20 hit-outs a game, before enduring a poor run of injury, missing round 12 with a back injury and rounds 14 and 15 with a calf injury. On 5 July 2017, Boyd was provided a leave of absence from the Bulldogs to receive treatment for clinical depression.

2018 season
Boyd's 2018 season was cut short by a back injury, as he was ruled out for the rest of the season after round 18.

2019 season
On 16 May 2019, having not played at the top level since round 18 in 2018 amid battles with injury and mental health, Boyd announced his immediate retirement from the AFL. Over his AFL career, he never played more than 15 games in a season.

Statistics

|- style="background-color: #EAEAEA"
! scope="row" style="text-align:center" | 2014
|
| 13 || 9 || 8 || 3 || 31 || 24 || 55 || 23 || 9 || 26 || 0.9 || 0.3 || 3.4 || 2.7 || 6.1 || 2.6 || 1.0 || 2.9
|- 
! scope="row" style="text-align:center" | 2015
|
| 17 || 14 || 16 || 6 || 74 || 41 || 115 || 47 || 33 || 41 || 1.1 || 0.4 || 5.3 || 2.9 || 8.2 || 3.4 || 2.4 || 2.9
|- style="background-color: #EAEAEA"
| scope=row bgcolor=F0E68C | 2016# 
|
| 17 || 15 || 13 || 12 || 82 || 98 || 180 || 49 || 39 || 127 || 0.9 || 0.8 || 5.5 || 6.5 || 12.0 || 3.3 || 2.6 || 8.5
|- 
! scope="row" style="text-align:center" | 2017
|
| 17 || 11 || 7 || 3 || 49 || 76 || 125 || 26 || 25 || 220 || 0.6 || 0.3 || 4.4 || 6.9 || 11.4 || 2.4 || 2.3 || 20.0
|- style="background-color: #EAEAEA"
! scope="row" style="text-align:center" | 2018
|
| 17 || 12 || 6 || 4 || 64 || 69 || 133 || 27 || 29 || 204 || 0.5 || 0.3 || 5.3 || 5.8 || 11.1 || 2.3 || 2.4 || 17.0
|- class="sortbottom"
! colspan=3| Career
! 61
! 50
! 28
! 300
! 308
! 608
! 172
! 135
! 618
! 0.8
! 0.5
! 4.9
! 5.0
! 10.0
! 2.8
! 2.2
! 10.1
|}

Honours and achievements
AFL
Team
AFL premiership player: 2016
Individual
AFL Rising Star nominee: 2015
TAC Cup
Team
TAC Cup premiership player: 2013

Personal
Boyd has an Australian father, Geoff, and a Danish mother, Anita.

Boyd studied a Bachelor of Business at Victoria University, Melbourne.

References

External links

1995 births
Living people
Australian people of Danish descent
Australian rules footballers from Victoria (Australia)
Eastern Ranges players
Greater Western Sydney Giants players
Western Bulldogs players
Western Bulldogs Premiership players
One-time VFL/AFL Premiership players
Victoria University, Melbourne alumni